Cedric Percelle Yarbrough (born March 20, 1973) is an American actor and comedian who stars in series Reno 911! as Deputy S. Jones and as Kenneth on the ABC sitcom Speechless, as well as voicing Gerald Fitzgerald on the Netflix comedy Paradise PD, Officer Meow Meow Fuzzyface on the Netflix comedy-drama BoJack Horseman, and Tom DuBois on the Adult Swim sitcom The Boondocks.

Early life
Yarbrough was born in Burnsville, Minnesota. He attended Burnsville Senior High School and later Minnesota State University, Mankato.  He is also an alumnus of Dudley Riggs' Brave New Workshop in Minneapolis.

Career
Yarbrough starred on the Comedy Central television series Reno 911! as Deputy S. (Sven) Jones which aired from 2003-2009 on Comedy Central. The series returned for a seventh season in 2020 on Quibi and for an eighth season in 2022 on The Roku Channel as Reno 911! Defunded. He also appeared in both of the feature length films, 2007's Reno 911!: Miami and 2021's Reno 911! The Hunt for QAnon.

He also provided the voice of Tom DuBois and Colonel H. Stinkmeaner on The Boondocks, Chocolate Giddy-up on Black Dynamite, and Firestorm and Black Lightning in the animated film Justice League: Crisis on Two Earths.

From 2016–2019, he co-starred in the ABC sitcom Speechless as Kenneth Clements. He has also had recurring roles in series including The Goldbergs, and Rake. On Carol's Second Act, which premiered in 2019, he stars as Nurse Dennis, which started out as a recurring role before being promoted to series regular early in the first season.

Filmography

References

External links
 

1973 births
Living people
African-American male actors
American male film actors
American male television actors
American male voice actors
Male actors from Minnesota
Minnesota State University, Mankato alumni
People from Burnsville, Minnesota
20th-century American male actors
21st-century American male actors
20th-century African-American people
21st-century African-American people